Irati Idiakez López (born 22 October 1996) is a Spanish para-snowboarder who competes in the SB-UL category.

Early life
Idiakez played football at a young age, then took part in sports courses in her home town of Getaria. She was not close to snowboarding until a bus accident in Chile in 2017 changed her life. She lost her right arm in that unfortunate accident. After surgery and still in rehab, she began searching for information. In order not to have any imbalances in her body, Idiakez was told that it was very important to do sports, and she turned to the Basque Adapted Sports Federation. Shortly afterwards, she received a call from the Royal Spanish Winter Sports Federation saying that they knew she had an accident and that she wanted to try them out. They organized a stay in Baqueira-Beret near Lleida, Catalonia. Until then, she didn't even realized para-snowboarding existed.

Career 
Idiakez won the silver medal in the women's dual banked slalom at the 2021 World Para Snow Sports Championships held in Lillehammer, Norway. She also competed in the women's snowboard cross event where she was disqualified.

References

External links 
 Irati Idiakez at World Para Snowboard

1996 births
Living people
People from Urola Kosta
Sportspeople from Gipuzkoa
Spanish female snowboarders
Spanish amputees
21st-century Spanish women